Richard J. Allen (born August 6, 1933) was a Republican member of both houses of the Michigan Legislature between 1969 and 1982.

Allen was elected to the Michigan House of Representatives in 1968 to succeed his father, Lester Allen. After serving two terms, Allen was defeated in the 1972 primary election. Two years later, he won election to the Michigan Senate, served two terms, and was defeated in the 1982 primary.

He was an unsuccessful candidate for Congress twice: in 1980, losing to Donald J. Albosta, and 1990, losing to Dave Camp in the primary. Allen was also a college professor, and a member of the Farm Bureau, Rotary, the Audubon Society, and the Sierra Club.

Allen was executive director of the Michigan State Fair from 1990 to 1993. He is also the namesake of the Dick Allen Lansing to Mackinaw Bike Tour (DALMAC).

References

1933 births
Living people
Republican Party members of the Michigan House of Representatives
Republican Party Michigan state senators
Candidates in the 1980 United States elections
Candidates in the 1990 United States elections
20th-century American politicians
People from Ithaca, Michigan
American veterinarians
Male veterinarians